Noman (2007) is the third book in the Noble Warriors trilogy, written by William Nicholson.

The Noble Warriors

The Noble Warriors, or Noman, are members of a religious community called the Noman. The Nom was formed by a great warlord, Noman, to protect their God, The All and Only. The All and Only has many other names: the Lost Child, the Loving Mother, the Wounded Warrior and the Wise Father. The God lives in the Garden, located on the island of Anacrea, until it is destroyed, when we, the reader, find that there are multiple gardens.

The Noble Warriors do not use weapons or have any armor; they use only true strength, which is also called Lir. The vow of the noble warriors (which Noman wrote) says they cannot fight wars or conquer land or empires. They cannot love any person above all others, build a lasting home, possess anything but can only use their powers to bring freedom to the enslaved and justice to the oppressed.

Plot summary
At the start of the book, Seeker is hunting down the last two savanters. He chases them through a mountain, through a mysterious valley and through the Glimmen. He finds Echo Kittle, who helps track them to a place called the Haven (which is an expensive refuge for fleeing people). He fights briefly with one of the savanters, who he does not manage to kill, instead becoming possessed by her. The other savanter flees, and manages to escape on a boat to other lands.

Meanwhile, the Wildman is head of the spikier army which formed at the end of Jango; Morning Star is there too. There is restlessness in the Spikier camp, and the Wildman is forced to kill Snake, his childhood friend, in a leadership battle. Morning Star, sickened by the events, leaves and returns to her home village. When she arrives there, she finds it mysteriously empty. Soon she finds where everyone has gone; a huge assembly of people who call themselves 'the Joyous'. The leader of the Joyous is a young man called the Joy Boy. He claims to be leading people to the 'Great Embrace', which is when all his followers will become God. Morning Star is suspicious of the Joy Boy, especially because he has no aura, but he infects her with joy, and she complies to find Seeker for him, under the premise that the Noble Warriors need joy more than anyone else. Soon after Morning Star leaves, the Wildman and the Spikier army join the Joyous.

Seeker moves through the garden, crossing a long bridge, and finds a chair in which he knows his God is sat. Seeker fears his God's nonexistence, but Jango appears, and reveals that he and Seeker are one and the same person. Jango tells Seeker to look with 'the eyes of faith'. Seeker looks at the chair and sees the All and Only. Then Noman, who has now also entered the Garden, tells Seeker to look with his own eyes.

Seeker returns to Radiance which is now ruled by the Spikers and Orlans. The Wildman hands over the Spiker army to Shab, and Caressa (who became the next Jahan when Amroth died near the start of the book) gives the silver whip of the Jahan to Sabin (the last living son of Amroth). The next day, Seeker, Morning Star, The Wildman and Caressa set off on Wildman's old ship down the river and to other lands.

See also

Noble Warriors Trilogy
Seeker
Jango
William Nicholson

External links
 William Nicholson's homepage
 The Noble warriors fan club

2007 British novels
British fantasy novels
Novels by William Nicholson
Egmont Books books